Duco Van Binsbergen (December 17, 1936 – April 4, 2009) was a provincial level politician from Alberta, Canada. He served as a member of the Legislative Assembly of Alberta from 1993 to 1997.

Political career
Van Binsbergen was elected to the Alberta Legislature in the 1993 Alberta general election. He defeated incumbent New Democrat Member Jerry Doyle to pick up the seat for the Liberals.  He ran for a second term in office in the 1997 Alberta general election but was defeated by Progressive Conservative candidate Ivan Strang.

Late life
Van Binsbergen sang as a Baritone in the Foothills Male Chorus after he retired from politics. His family moved to the Annapolis Royal area in Nova Scotia in 2007, and he died at the Halifax Infirmary on April 4, 2009.

References

External links
Legislative Assembly of Alberta Members Listing

Alberta Liberal Party MLAs
1936 births
2009 deaths